The 2009 Great Alaska Shootout, was the 31st Great Alaska Shootout competition, the annual college basketball tournament in Anchorage, Alaska that features colleges from all over the United States. The 2009 event was held from November 25, 2010, through November 28, 2009.

Men's 
For the 2009 Tournament with a 6 team field, teams were split into pools of three utilizing a Round-robin tournament format.

Pools

Pool A

Pool B

Championship Round 

}

Women's

Bracket

References

Great Alaska Shootout
Great Alaska Shootout
Great Alaska Shootout
November 2009 sports events in the United States